Cobalt(II) fluoride is a chemical compound with the formula (CoF2). It is a pink crystalline solid compound which is antiferromagnetic at low temperatures (TN=37.7 K) The formula is given for both the red tetragonal crystal, (CoF2), and the tetrahydrate red orthogonal crystal, (CoF2·4H2O). CoF2 is used in oxygen-sensitive fields, namely metal production. In low concentrations, it has public health uses.
CoF2 is sparingly soluble in water. The compound can be dissolved in warm mineral acid, and will decompose in boiling water. Yet the hydrate is water-soluble, especially the di-hydrate CoF2·2H2  O and tri-hydrate CoF2·3H2O forms of the compound. The hydrate will also decompose with heat.

Like some other metal difluorides, CoF2 crystallizes in the rutile structure, which features octahedral Co centers and planar fluorides.

Preparation
Cobalt(II) fluoride can be prepared from anhydrous cobalt(II) chloride or cobalt(II) oxide in a stream of hydrogen fluoride:

CoCl2  + 2HF  →  CoF2  + 2HCl
CoO + 2HF → CoF2  + H2O

It is produced in the reaction of cobalt (III) fluoride with water.

The tetrahydrate cobalt(II) fluoride is formed by dissolving cobalt(II) in hydrofluoric acid. The anhydrous fluoride can be extracted from this by dehydration. Other synthesis can occur at higher temperatures. It has been shown that at 500 °C fluorine will combine with cobalt producing a mixture of CoF2   and CoF3.

Uses
Cobalt(II) fluoride can be used as a catalyst to alloy metals. It is also used for optical deposition, of which it tremendously improves optical quality. Cobalt(II) fluoride is available in most volumes in an ultra high purity composition. High purity compositions improve optical qualities and its usefulness as a standard.

Analysis
To analyze this compound, Cobalt (II) fluoride can be dissolved in nitric acid. The solution is then diluted with water until appropriate concentration for AA or ICP spectrophotometry for the cobalt. A small amount of salt can be dissolved in cold water and analyzed for fluoride ion by a fluoride ion-selective electrode or ion chromatography.

Chemical Properties
CoF2 is a weak Lewis acid. Cobalt(II) complexes are usually octahedral or tetrahedral. As a 19-electron species it is a good reducing agent, fairly oxidizable into an 18-electron compound. Cobalt(II) fluoride can be reduced by hydrogen at a 300 °C.

References

External links

 National Pollutant Inventory - Cobalt fact sheet
National Pollutant Inventory - Fluoride and compounds fact sheet

Fluorides
Metal halides
Cobalt(II) compounds